Ruth Slenczynska (born January 15, 1925) is an American pianist with Polish roots.

Early life

Slenczynska was born in Sacramento, California. Her Polish father, Joseph Slenczynski (Józef Ślenczyński), was a violinist. Pushed by her father and starting at age three, Slenczynska was forced to practice the piano relentlessly. When she was four, she began her piano studies in Europe, later studying with Artur Schnabel, Egon Petri, Alfred Cortot, Josef Hofmann, and Sergei Rachmaninoff. She played her debut in Berlin at age six and made her debut in Paris with a full orchestra at seven years of age.

Career
Slenczynska was accepted to the University of California, Berkeley. In 1964, she accepted a full-time position at Southern Illinois University Edwardsville as Artist in Residence, a title she retained until 1987. A large assortment of her memorabilia and recordings constitutes a Special Collection in the Lovejoy Library at SIUE. In 1957 she published a book of memoirs, Forbidden Childhood, which deals with life as a child prodigy, and a book on piano technique, Music at Your Fingertips: Aspects of Pianoforte Technique.

Selected recordings
"Complete American Decca recordings", Chopin : Les 24 préludes, Les 24 Études, Les 16 valses, Les quatre impromptus, Les quatre scherzo, Les quatre ballades, les 16 valses, Polonaise op.53. Liszt/Chopin : Six chants polonais. Liszt : Rhapsodie espagnole, Rhapsodie hongroise n°15, Étude n°5, six grandes études by Paganini, Concerto pour piano n°1. Saint-Saëns : concerto pour piano n°2. Decca (1956/1962). 10 CD DG Eloquence 2020. Diapason d'or 2021. "My Life in Music", Decca (2022).

References 

•

Sources
Beversluis, John.  "Ruth Slenczynska in Concert."  American Record Guide, Jul/Aug 1999, Vol. 62, Issue n. 4, p 255.
Hyde, Carol Shannon.  "A Case Study of an Artist-in-Residence: Ruth Slenczynska, Concert Pianist."  Dissertation Abstracts International Section A, Aug 1989, Vol. 50, page 293.
Mach, Elyse.  "Practice Notes."  Clavier, Oct 2002, Vol. 41, Issue n. 8, pp 46–49.
Muschalek, Clare. "Great Pianists Can Teach."  Music Journal, Feb 1973, Vol. 311, pp 16–19.
Nilsen, Richard.  "Piano Prodigy Ruth Slenczynska Now a Legend at 87", Arizona Republic News, Jan 24, 2013.
Rabinowitz, Peter.  "I Never Look Back: A Conversation with Ruth Slenczynska."  Fanfare, Jan/Feb 1999, Vol. 22, p 86.
Rabinowitz, Peter. "Doing it Yourself: a Conversation with Ruth Slenczynska."  Fanfare, May/June 1998, Vol. 21, p 47.
Rockwell, John.  "Piano: Ruth Slenczynska."  New York Times, November 16, 1984.
Rosenstiel, Leonie.  "Remembrances of Nadia Boulanger."  Virtuoso, 1980, Vol. 1, Issue n. 3, pp 33–36.
Rothchild, E.  "Ruth Slenczynska: On Playing the Chopin Etudes (interviews)."  Clavier, 1976, Vol. 15 Issue n. 2, pp. 14–21.
Silverman, R. J. "The Focus Sharpens."  Piano Quarterly, 1983, Vol. 31, Issue n. 122, pp. 34–35.
Slecysnksa, Ruth.  Ruth Slenczynska: Tribute to Rachmanioff, DVD, Video Artists International, 2007.
Slenczynska, Ruth. Music At Your Fingertips, NY, 1961, Da Capo Press.
Slenczynska, Ruth and Louis Biancolli. Forbidden Childhood, NY, 1957.
Slenczynska, Ruth.  "Thoughts on Memorizing."
Slenczynska, Ruth. "Build Your Own Career."  Music Journal, April 1974, Vol. 32, p. 12.
Slenczynska, Ruth.  "The Opening of the Rachmaninov Second Concerto."  Clavier, 1973, Vol. 12, Issue n. 7, p 18.
Slenczynska, Ruth.  "Practice and Performance Suggestions for Rachmaninoff's Etude-Tableau, No. 2."  Clavier, 1973, Vol. 12, Issue n. 7, p 29.
Slenczynska, Ruth.  "Private Lesson: On Prokofiev's Vision Fuguitive XVI."  Keyboard, Feb 1986, Vol. 12, pp 36–37.
Slenczynska, Ruth.  "On Chopin's Unexpected Invitations to Dance."  Piano Quarterly, 1979, Vol. 27, Issue n. 106, p 24.
Slenczynska, Ruth.  "Private Lesson: Beyond Polyrhythms: a Chopin Rubato."  Keyboard, Oct 1986, Vol. 12, p 93.
Slenczynska, Ruth.  "Private Lesson: How a Pianist Works on Ear-Hand Coordination."  Keyboard, Jan 1986, Vol. 12, p 112.
Slenczynska, Ruth.  "Private Lesson: Gaining Left-Hand Awareness."  Keyboard, Sep 1986, Vol. 12, p 109.
Slenczynska, Ruth.  "Private Lesson: Polyrhythmical Skill, Two Against Three."   Keyboard, May 1986, Vol. 12, p 27.
Slenczynska, Ruth.  "Private Lesson: Exercises for Smooth Polyrhythms: Three Against Four."   Keyboard, Jan 1986, Vol. 12, pp 32–33.
Slenczynska, Ruth.  "Private Lesson: On Schumann's 'Important Event' from Kinderszehen."  Keyboard, April 1986, Vol. 12, pp 32–33.
Slenczynska, Ruth.  "Grandfatherly Guidance."  Clavier, 1973, Vol. 12, Issue n. 7, pp 15–16.
Slenczynska, Ruth.  "Haydn's Sonata No. 35 in A Flat."  Clavier, 1972, Vol. 11, Issue n. 5, pp 18–25.
Slenczynska, Ruth.  "Follow-up on Haydn."  Clavier, 1972, Vol. 11, Issue n. 7, pp 18–26.
Slenczynska, Ruth.  "Private Lesson: Performance Techniques for 'Sonata K. 239' by Scriabin."  Keyboard, Dec 1985, Vol. 11, pp 24–26
Slenczynska, Ruth.  "Learning Approaches to Chopin's Prelude in C Scharp Minor, Op. 28, No. 10."  Piano Quarterly, 1974, Vol. 22, Issue n. 85, pp 31–33.
Slenczynska, Ruth.  "Bach's 'Three Voiced Fugue in C Minor."  Clavier, 1988, Vol. 27, Issue n. 1, pp 26–29.
Slenczynska, Ruth.  "Master Class: Rachmaninoff 'Prelude Op. 23, No. 4'"  Clavier, 1979, Vol. 18, Issue n. 9, pp 20–24.
Slenczynska, Ruth.  "Good Octaves and How to Acquire Them (Includes List of Music)."  Clavier, 1977, Vol. 16, Issue n. 3, pp. 37–41.
Slenczynska, Ruth.  "Learning Approaches to Chopin's Prelude in E Major, Op. 28, No. 9.  Piano Quarterly, 1973, Vol. 21, Issue n. 81, pp 26–31.
Slenczynska. Ruth.  "On Chopin's Unexpected Invitations to Dance."  Piano Quarterly, 1979, Vol. 27, Issue n. 106, p 24.
Slenczynska, Ruth.  "On Preparations for a Piano Competition", March 2005.
Tsai, Sin-Hsing. "The Art of Ruth Slenczynska, Vol. 5."  Clavier Companion, Nov/Dec 2010, Vol. 2 Issue n. 6, pp. 64–66.
Tobias, Karen.  "Madam Ruth."  Clavier, April 2007, Vol. 46 Issue n. 4, pg. 12–39.
Verna, Paul.  "Vital Reissues."  Billboard'', Jan 1999, Vol. 111, Issue n. 5, pp 22–28.

External links
Southern Illinois University: Ruth Slenczynska
Polonia Global Fund: Ruth Slenczynska Person of the Month 10/2004
Ruth Slenczynska: Music Biography, Credits, and Discography: All Music
Rachmaninov's Last Living Pupil to Present Workshops at Lebanon Valley College, Feb. 2013
Some programs, photos and introductions on her 2 highly successful tours of Southern Africa, 1963&78

1925 births
Living people
American classical pianists
American women classical pianists
Child classical musicians
Southern Illinois University Edwardsville faculty
20th-century American pianists
20th-century American women pianists
21st-century classical pianists
American people of Polish descent
21st-century American women pianists
21st-century American pianists
University of California, Berkeley alumni